Major General Sultan Mahmood was a General of the Indian Army.

Biography

He was a born in Mysore, India, and is the younger brother of Lieutenant General Jameel Mahmood, ex-General Officer Commanding-in-Chief (GOC-in-C), Eastern Command of the Indian Army. He is a relative of Lieutenant General (retd.) Mohammad Ahmed Zaki of the Indian Army.

In the Indo-Pakistani War of 1965 commanded four medium guns in the Kashmir Valley. In the Indo-Pakistani War of 1971 he was part of the victorious force against East Pakistan. He later commanded an artillery brigade, serving as Brigadier-in-Charge in Punjab, and as the sub-area commander of Karnataka and Goa. Upon being promoted to the rank of major general he was appointed Director General (Recruiting) at the Army HQ in New Delhi.

As of 2001, he was one of only eight Muslims in the Indian Army to rise to the rank of major general.

He was an alumnus of the Bishop Cotton Boys' School, Bangalore, India.

See also
 Hyderabadi Muslims
 Golkonda
 Hyderabad State
 Muslim culture of Hyderabad
 History of Hyderabad for a history of the city of Hyderabad.
 Hyderabad (India) for the city.

References

Indian Muslims
Bishop Cotton Boys' School alumni
Indian generals
Military personnel from Hyderabad, India